Fatoma is a village and commune in the Cercle of Mopti in the Mopti Region of Mali. The commune contains 24 villages and in 2009 had a population of 24,595. The village of Fatoma lies 10 kilometres north of Sévaré.

References

External links
.

Communes of Mopti Region